Otelo Nuno Romão Saraiva de Carvalho, GCL (31 August 1936 – 25 July 2021) was a Portuguese military officer. He was the chief strategist of the 1974 Carnation Revolution in Lisbon. After the Revolution, Otelo assumed leadership roles in the first Portuguese Provisional Governments, alongside Vasco Gonçalves and Francisco da Costa Gomes, and as the head of military defense force COPCON. In 1976, Otelo ran in the first Portuguese presidential election, in which he placed second with the base of his support coming from the far-left. In the 1980s he founded a leftist terrorist organization that sought to undermine the very democracy that resulted from the 1974 Carnation Revolution where he had had a leading role. Otelo was tried and sentenced for being a leading member of the terrorist group Forças Populares 25 de Abril, which killed 19 people in several terrorist attacks. In 1996, the Portuguese Parliament voted to pardon him and several others who had been sentenced for FP-25 activities. The pardons were promoted by President Mário Soares as a gesture of democratic reconciliation.

Early life
Otelo Saraiva de Carvalho was born in Lourenço Marques, Portuguese Mozambique (now Maputo, Mozambique) on 31 August 1936, of Luso-Goan (Portuguese India) ancestry. Named by his theatre-minded parents after Shakespeare's Othello, he completed his secondary education at a state school in Lourenço Marques. His father was a civil servant and his mother a railway clerk. He entered the Military Academy in Lisbon in 1955, at the age of nineteen. 

Otelo spent many years in the colonial wars in Africa. He served in Portuguese Angola from 1961 to 1963 as a second lieutenant, and as a captain from 1965 to 1967. He was posted to Portuguese Guinea in 1970 as a captain, under General António de Spínola, in charge of civilian affairs and the propaganda campaign Hearts and Minds.

On 5 November 1960, he married Maria Dina Afonso Alambre with whom he had two daughters and a son.

In 1970, Otelo attended the funeral of António de Oliveira Salazar, the Prime Minister of Portugal from 1932 to 1968. At the funeral, Otelo was seen weeping over the casket of Salazar.

Carnation Revolution and PREC

Otelo joined the underground Movement of Armed Forces (Movimento das Forças Armadas - MFA), which carried out a coup d'état in Lisbon on 25 April 1974, in which he played a directing role.

In July 1974, Otelo was made a brigadier and placed in command of the special military Command for the Continent COPCON, which was set up to secure order in the country and to promote the revolutionary process. In 1975, infighting in the MFA intensified with Otelo representing the left-wing of the movement. After the Carnation Revolution, the tension In between communist and noncommunist forces started to increase as MFA was deeply turning left as a consequence of communist party and the extreme left forces were becoming more intervening.

On his attempt to revert President Antonio Spinola tried to actively intervene appealing to «silent majority» against the political radicalization that was being lived to. On 28 September, He tried to convene a large popular demonstration in Lisbon that aimed to thwart the movement and show to the loss of influence of moderate forces. After the failure of his movement, Spinola resigned, and Costa Gomes was nominee for the role.

However, MFA soldiers and left-wing parties, led by the PCP, blocked access to Lisbon the previous morning, with barricades at various points. The atmosphere was close to civil war and at the end of the day Otelo, then commander of COPCON, announced: "The Armed Forces Movement is in complete control of the situation."

A right-wing putsch attempt, led by António de Spínola, was thwarted by the timely intervention of COPCON in March 1975. Otelo became part of the Council of the Revolution which was created on 14 March 1975. In May 1975 he was temporarily promoted to General and, together with Francisco da Costa Gomes and Vasco Gonçalves, formed the Directório (Directorate).

The prime Minister Vasco Gonçalves decreed "victory over reaction" and the country would live another troubled reddish year.  In a memo to American President Gerald Ford, Henry Kissinger states that “perhaps the most important lesson from the Portuguese weekend's events is the close coordination between  MFA and the Communist Party. Between them their control of the situation was so complete that in all practical respects the country was in their hands” Kissinger wrote to the President.

In July 1975, Otelo visited Cuba with a delegation of Portuguese military officers to meet Fidel Castro. Otelo participated in the Cuban 26 of July celebrations with Castro. During this trip, Castro informed Otelo of his intention to send Cuban troops to Angola to support MPLA. In response, Otelo assured Castro that the Portuguese government would have no objection to the involvement of Cuba there.

The period In between 11 March and 25 November was later called the “Hot Summer of 1975” due to the number of clashes and force measurement between communist and non communists.

Costa Gomes, aligned with the communist party Otelo's success led to his being named the commander of the newly created Continente Operational Command (Comando Operacional do Continente - COPCON) for Lisbon Region. Created in July 1974 by President António Spínola to enforce the MFA program, COPCON brought together soldiers from the various branches of the armed forces and was composed of two divisions: one for Information and the other for operations.

This was a troubled period, with major social and political upheavals, clashes between the military and the emergence of various extreme leftist movements. Otelo told in an interview that, at that time, various social problems began to appear at COPCON, with workers seeing their bosses flee and becoming unemployed, for example. Then they began to receive rural workers who were unhappy with the agrarian reform. All sorts of problems came.

At the head of COPCON, Otelo begins to make controversial decisions. Among these controversial measures are the blank arrest warrants, without the intervention of the judiciary, which Otelo signed and which were later executed by his subordinates, often during the night without the victims even knowing why they were being detained.

In an interview he gave and in response to whether COPCON was concerned about the advance of counter-revolutionary forces, which were assaulting, destroying, burning down the headquarters of left-wing parties, the Communist Party, the MDP, and other left-wing parties, Otelo says a phrase that would also become famous for its controversy: “Look, we are, in fact, very worried. This is growing very fast, and I hope we don't have to put the counter-revolutionaries in Campo Pequeno before they put us there”.

On 25 November 1975, an extreme left-wing coup was attempted. Those who took part in the attempt were members of the MFA, the Portuguese Army Commandos, and COPCON. The coup, orchestrated by Otelo, failed to take control of the Portuguese government. Because of this failure, Otelo was imprisoned, COPCON was disbanded, and António Ramalho Eanes rose to power. As punishment for participation in the coup, Otelo was imprisoned for three months.

1976 presidential campaign and following years 
In 1976, Otelo unsuccessfully stood as a candidate for president against Eanes. Throughout his campaign, Otelo campaigned on a platform promoting socialism, national independence, and popular power. Otelo's support came from the Portuguese working class, specifically in Setúbal and Alentejo. A notable supporter and organizer of Otelo's campaign was Zeca Afonso, a popular Portuguese revolutionary songwriter. Otelo finished second in the election, with 792,760 votes (16.46%) and António Ramalho Eanes was elected president with 61,59%.

Still in the second half of the 70s, Otelo actively participated in the creation of the GDUP - Grupos Dinamizadores de Unidade Popular - popular action groups, similar to what Otelo had seen in Cuba. GDUP grew throughout the country, fueled by Otelo's run for Presidency of the Republic. They majority of members were in favor of armed struggle as a political weapon.

From the success from the presidential election, the Unitary Organization of Workers (OUT) emerges on April 78, having Otelo as one of its first supporters and promoter’s. Because OUT did not identify itself with the new parliamentary democratic regime, which emerged on the 25th of November 1975, it didn´t constitute itself as a political party. Instead, it was only a political association. Among the approved motions, on first OUT congress, in Marinha Grande, the defense of violence as a political weapon stands out: «people's power will only be possible (...) through the recourse (...) to armed revolutionary violence» and it can only be a reality. ...if the workers are armed, constituting a (...) people's army", and "Only with violence (...) is it possible for the people to conquer political power."

Most OUT structure and leadership was filled by PRP leaders, a party that shared some of its headquarters, allowing Otelo, who despite his military condition, was entitled to be considered a permanent guest, be present at the meetings, although without any voting rights. Less than two months after the aforementioned OUT congress, Revolutionary Party of the Proletariat / Revolutionary Brigades PRP/BR main leaders Isabel do Carmo and Carlos Antunes were arrested. During the same police operation, a PJ agent was killed.

With Isabel do Carmo and Carlos Antunes imprisonment and the consequent power vacuum on PRP leadership, a rupture was generated between them, who advocated this was not the time to develop OUT project and the other militants, led by Pedro Goulart, who defended greater violence, namely assassinations, in an attempt to radicalize the armed struggle. That later was materialized in the Projecto Global/FUP/FP-25 de Abril.

Meanwhile, Otelo was penalized by the Superior Council of Discipline of the Army with the consequent passage to the situation of compulsory reserve, for having an active participation in politics, incompatible with his military status.

1980 presidential campaign

In 1980, Otelo was a candidate in the Portuguese presidential elections .He was nominated for the presidential race by the far-left political party which he was one of the founders - Força de Unidade Popular (FUP). He continued to base his campaign upon building socialism in Portugal. Once again, Otelo received support and advice from Portuguese musician José Afonso throughout the campaign. This time, Otelo did not fare nearly as well as he had done four years beforehand. He finished a poor third, with 85,896 votes (1.4%). After the election, Otelo confessed that he voted for his rival Eanes in the election, "to avoid the victory of the right-wing candidate Soares Carneiro".

Terrorism and imprisonment
After the defeat in the presidential elections, Otelo Saraiva de Carvalho, together with Pedro Goulart, Mouta Liz created the Global Project (Projeto Global). It, "...had as purposes, among others, to create conditions that would allow its members, in the long term and through the armed insurrection, to seize the State and install popular power through the institutionalization of what they called direct and basist democracy and subvert the functioning of the institutions of the State enshrined in the Constitution, as this is one of the adequate conditions for the aforementioned armed insurrection..." It brought together the most radical sectors of the revolutionary far left, which were opposed to the establishment of a party base parliamentary representative system, the restoration of the capitalist economic and social system. This was a  superstructure without legal existence and consisted of several components:

 Mass Political Organization - legal component constituted by a legal political party, the Popular Unity Force (FUP);
 Armed Civilian Structure (Estrutura Civil Armada/ECA) - which corresponded to the terrorist group Forças Populares 25 de Abril, responsible for the assaults, bombings, and murders.
 Military headquarters, led by Otelo and aimed recruiting military personnel for the project, standing in the background and would support the insurrection, when asked for.
 OSCAR, which was none than Otelo himself and which sought to capitalize on his high awareness, seeking to attract elements of civil society to the project;

The Global Project (Projecto Global) coordinated the clandestine and subversive component of the terrorist group FP-25, using armed violence as a political weapon, and the political party Força de Unidade Popular (FUP), which gave it political and legal coverage. The distinction between the FUP and the FP-25 was similar to the one existing in the United Kingdom between Sinn Féin and the IRA or in Spain between Herri Batasuna and ETA.

Global Project´s first step  was the creation of a political party – FUP/Força de Unidade Popular (Popular Unity Force) on March 28, 1980, two months after Otelo's defeats in the 1980 presidential elections and less than one month before the first attacks by FP-25.  FUP, despite inheriting part of the physical and human structures of the former PRP/BR, the party from which most of the operatives came, never came to run for any legislative or municipal elections.

As so, on 20 April 1980, five days before the Carnation Revolution anniversary, FP-25 de Abril initiate its activity with dozens of bomb attacks across the country, against government, police or military buildings. Join with the initial announcement a document named  "''Manifesto ao Povo Trabalhador''“, mentioned serious deviations from the 1976 Constitution, namely the abandonment of socialism, the abandonment of the land ownership nationalization (“Reforma Agrária”) and the loss of the people´s decision-making process.

Just two weeks later, a GNR soldier was killed during a bank robbery. Over 7 years, they were responsible for 19 deaths, including a four-month-old baby, a General Director of Prison Service,  a dissident/repentant terrorist, several National Republican Guards (GNR) soldiers and five terrorists killed during robberies or clashes with security forces. FP-25´s last action resulted in the death of a Judiciary Police officer, in August 1987. The violence was partially stopped in June 1984, with a secret police operation under a code name "Orion", which resulted in the arrest of most of its leaders and operatives. They would be later tried in October 1986.

The Arrest and Judgment 
On June 20th, 1984, Otelo was arrested under the charge of being   Forças Populares 25 de Abril  founding member and leader.  During "Orion" police operation, various incriminating documents were seized at Força de Unidade Popular/(FUP) headquarters - the organization´s legal political party, as well as at Otelo ’s residence. Among the seized documents were the two notebooks handwritten by Otelo, one green and one red, with several detailed reports of operations and meetings, namely the famous Conclave meeting in Serra da Estrela. Cândida Almeida, prosecutor in the trial recalls one of the most famous meetings, held in Serra da Estrela where everyone was hooded, Otelo had the number seven. Today it would be possible to do the DNA of the hood, but Otelo also never denied that he had been there”.

On Conclave, a discussion was held regarding future strategy, one of its most important document was the nº 16. It´s a guideline for violence defining who and how should be carried out the robberies and homicides, Otelo has written with his hand that he was content to know what the profile of the individual to be slaughtered. So he knew perfectly well, he and the others in the military political leadership knew perfectly well who did what, so it can be said that they were moral authors. Those handwritten notebooks by Otelo are part of the case file and were reproduced in several books alluding to the process. Otelo himself acknowledges having been present with a hood at the Conclave meeting, held in Serra da Estrela. According to him, in an interview with  Expresso newspaper, it would have been a requirement of the ECA (Armed Civilian Structure), known as Forças Populares 25 de Abril.

Usually, Otelo recorded in his personal notebook everything that was said at the meetings of Political-Military Board Projecto Global (FP-25) identifying all the people present by abbreviations and very enlightening and detailing everything that had been said by each of the authors. Otelo`s notebooks were, in fact, responsible for incriminating him as well as many of the detainees, as well as clarifying many of the organization's actions. At the hearings, in addition to confessing almost the entirety of the facts, Otelo was unable to provide the least plausible explanation for the crimes he was accused of and it turned out that they were not only false accusations that supported the accusation, but a source of evidence, in which his manuscript stands out, where everything is reported with acronyms and names, which he was unveiled during the hearings.

In October 1985, Otelo was tried and convicted in court for his role in leading the FP 25 de Abril and sentenced to 15 years in prison. The sentence would be confirmed by the Court of Appeal, which increased the sentence to 18 years and later the Supreme Court of Justice would fix it at 17 years in prison.

He would appeal the sentence to the Constitutional Court. As the period of preventive detention had expired, since the sentence had not yet become final, he was released on May 17, 1989, after five years in prison, awaiting trial on parole. He was also demoted to lieutenant-colonel.

Pardon and Amnesty 
The various appeals filed, as well as the constant transition of the process between each of the courts, made it impossible for the sentence to become final, confirming the definitive arrest of the defendants. The President, Mario Soares has always tried to preserve the historic memory of Otelo Saraiva de Carvalho as a Carnation revolution hero and has always tried to pursue a political solution instead a letting flow judicial and criminal processes against him. As so, he pushed parliament whose left wing majority was supported by the socialist PS and the communist party PCP, to approve an amnesty. Although his connection with the terrorist organization has been proved in court, in 2004 the Parliament approved the pardon, followed by an amnesty “for politically motivated offenses committed between 27 July 1976 and 21 June of 1991”, which naturally included those committed by the FP 25 de Abril. Outside were the so-called "blood crimes".

Some of the beneficiaries were now granted amnesty for the second time after being pardoned in the late 1970s as members of the PRP/BR. Even so, the amnesty also did not please the terrorists, who soon came to demand that it be extended to blood crimes, since without the political component, whitewashed in the amnesty, these would be judged as crimes of common crime.

Assassinations and Blood Crimes 
However, the various crimes committed and spread across the various districts are unified in a single process. There are more than 150 cases, two of which 10 completed homicides and 7 attempted, to be judged. It is from here that process 396/91 is created, which will bring together the judgment of blood crimes, which took place later and had the sentence handed down on April 6, 2001 and confirmed by the Lisbon Court of Appeal in June 2003. By the time of the trial, almost 20 years had passed since some crimes, the repentant were in Brazil or Mozambique and the defendants opted for silence. Even so, evidence was produced in relation to the crime of terrorist association, which was not being tried and which had already been amnestied. “The judgment detailed the crimes of blood, also listing all the names of the organization's members and leaders, including Otelo Saraiva de Carvalho:

“The court proves everything in the steps that are taken for this or that murderer, even how decisions are made by the terrorist organization, the same is no longer true when it comes to identifying who pulls the trigger, who sets the bomb, who kills, who tries”

“They belonged to the same terrorist organization, called «Forças Populares 25 de Abril – FP25»:”… Otelo Nuno Romão Saraiva de Carvalho…”

“…all those defendants, and other unidentified individuals, at the end of 1979, beginning of 1980, were grouped together, of their own free will and perfectly conscious, with the shared intention of all to carry out a plan, which was engendered by some and then accepted by the others, all acting in concert to implement this plan, in an articulated and structured way, and continued over time, through insertion in their own structures”.

  “… the defendant Otelo, had top seat within Projecto Global /FP-25 highest decision-making committee. This body was the military political direction (called DPM) responsible for strategic direction  and coordination between the political party (FUP), the military organization (PF-25) and all other components….”

Even with the possibility of appealing to the Supreme Court of Justice, the Public Prosecutor's Office allowed the appeal period to pass when it had committed to the repentant ones to fight until the last instance for their exemptions from punishment. This led the Attorney General's Office to launch an inquiry to determine responsibilities. A prosecutor was held responsible for having been responsible for this prescription.

Later life and death
While imprisoned for his involvement with FP-25, Otelo met Maria Filomena Morais and began a Ménage à trois with her and his wife Maria Dina Afonso Alambre, spending Monday to Thursday with Filomena and from Friday to Sunday with Dina.

Otelo retired from military service and public life in 1989. Following his retirement, Otelo remained a political activist and was featured in multiple documentaries about the Carnation Revolution.

In 2011, during the Portuguese financial crisis when the country was nearing the end of the center-left government of José Socrates and had to request international financial assistance, Otelo stated that he wouldn't have started the revolution if he had known what the country would become after it. He also stated that the country would need a man as honest as Salazar to deal with the crisis, but from a non-fascist perspective.

In March 2020, he was hospitalized in Lisbon for heart failure. On 10 July 2021, Otelo was hospitalized again, at Army Hospital, in Lisbon. Otelo died fifteen days later on 25 July, aged 84.

Influence
Otelo is still an icon for activists of the left in Portugal, but is hated by many right-wingers who consider him a terrorist who tried to seize power in the country in order to become Portugal's Fidel Castro.

In 2006, Otelo was voted the 68th greatest Portuguese in the Os Grandes Portugueses competition.

Election results

Presidential elections of 27 June 1976

|-
!style="background-color:#E9E9E9" align=left colspan="2" rowspan="2"|Candidates 
!style="background-color:#E9E9E9" align=left rowspan="2"|Supporting parties 	
!style="background-color:#E9E9E9" align=right colspan="2"|First round
|-
!style="background-color:#E9E9E9" align=right|Votes
!style="background-color:#E9E9E9" align=right|%
|-
|style="width: 9px" bgcolor=gray align="center" | 
|align=left|António Ramalho Eanes 
|align=left|Independent
|align="right" |2,967,137
|align="right" |61.59
|-
|style="width: 8px" bgcolor=gray align="center" |
|align=left|Otelo Saraiva de Carvalho
|align=left|Independent
|align="right" |792,760
|align="right" |16.46
|-
|style="width: 8px" bgcolor=gray align="center" | 
|align=left|José Pinheiro de Azevedo
|align=left|Independent
|align="right" |692,147
|align="right" |14.37
|-
|style="width: 8px" bgcolor=red align="center" | 
|align=left|Octávio Rodrigues Pato
|align=left|Portuguese Communist Party
|align="right" |365,586
|align="right" |7.59
|-
|colspan="3" align=left style="background-color:#E9E9E9"|Total valid
|width="65" align="right" style="background-color:#E9E9E9"|4,817,630
|width="40" align="right" style="background-color:#E9E9E9"|100.00
|-
|align=right colspan="3"|Blank ballots
|width="65" align="right" |43,242
|width="40" align="right" |0.89
|-
|align=right colspan="3" |Invalid ballots
|width="65" align="right"|20,253
|width="40" align="right"|0.41
|-
|colspan="3" align=left style="background-color:#E9E9E9"|Total (turnout 75.47%)
|width="65" align="right" style="background-color:#E9E9E9"|4,881,125 
|width="40" align="right" style="background-color:#E9E9E9"|
|-
|colspan=5 align=left|Source: Comissão Nacional de Eleições
|}

Presidential elections of 7 December 1980

|-
!style="background-color:#E9E9E9" align=left colspan="2" rowspan="2"|Candidates 
!style="background-color:#E9E9E9" align=left rowspan="2"|Supporting parties 	
!style="background-color:#E9E9E9" align=right colspan="2"|First round
|-
!style="background-color:#E9E9E9" align=right|Votes
!style="background-color:#E9E9E9" align=right|%
|-
|style="width: 9px" bgcolor=gray align="center" |
|align=left|António Ramalho Eanes
|align=left|Independent
|align="right" |3,262,520
|align="right" |56.44
|-
|style="width: 8px" bgcolor=#00FFFF align="center" | 
|align=left|António Soares Carneiro 
|align=left|Democratic Alliance
|align="right" |2,325,481
|align="right" |40.23
|-
|style="width: 9px" bgcolor=gray align="center" |
|align=left|Otelo Saraiva de Carvalho
|align=left|Força de Unidade Popular
|align="right" |85,896
|align="right" |1.49
|-
|style="width: 9px" bgcolor=gray align="center" |
|align=left|Carlos Galvão de Melo
|align=left|Independent
|align="right" |48,468
|align="right" |0.84
|-
|style="width: 9px" bgcolor=gray align="center" |
|align=left|António Pires Veloso
|align=left|Independent
|align="right" |45,132
|align="right" |0.78
|-
|style="width: 9px" bgcolor=red align="center" |
|align=left|António Aires Rodrigues
|align=left|Workers Party of Socialist Unity
|align="right" |12,745
|align="right" |0.22
|-
|style="width: 9px" bgcolor=red align="center" |
|align=left|Carlos Brito
|align=left|Portuguese Communist Party
|colspan="2" align="center" |left the race
|-
|colspan="3" align=left style="background-color:#E9E9E9"|Total valid
|width="65" align="right" style="background-color:#E9E9E9"|5,780,242
|width="40" align="right" style="background-color:#E9E9E9"|100.00
|-
|align=right colspan="3"|Blank ballots
|width="65" align="right" |44,014
|width="40" align="right" |0.75
|-
|align=right colspan="3" |Invalid ballots
|width="65" align="right"|16,076
|width="40" align="right"|0.28
|-
|colspan="3" align=left style="background-color:#E9E9E9"|Total (turnout 84.39%)
|width="65" align="right" style="background-color:#E9E9E9"|5,840,332   
|width="40" align="right" style="background-color:#E9E9E9"|
|-
|colspan=5 align=left|Source: Comissão Nacional de Eleições
|}

Publications
 Cinco meses mudaram Portugal (1975)
 Contribuiçāo para uma alternativa popular à crise da economia em Portugal: texto de apoio da candidatura à Presidência da República de Otelo Saraiva de Carvalho (1976)
 Otelo: o povo é quem mais ordena (1977)
 Memorias de abril (1978)
 Alvorada em abril (1984)
 Presos por um Fio, Portugal e as FP-25 de Abril, de Nuno Gonçalo Poças, Casa das Letras, 4-2021,  
 Viver e morrer em nome das FP-25, de António José Vilela, Casa das Letras, 6-2004, 
 "Caso FP-25 de Abril": Alegações do Ministério Público, Ministério da Justiça, 1987

References

External links
 Centre for Documentation of 25 April: Otelo Saraiva de Carvalho

1936 births
2021 deaths
Arms traders
Saraiva Carvalho, Otelo
Carnation Revolution
People convicted on terrorism charges
People from Maputo
Portuguese people of Goan descent
Portuguese revolutionaries
Portuguese soldiers